Kenneth Albert "Whitey" Miller (May 2, 1915 – April 3, 1991) was a Major League Baseball pitcher who appeared in four games, all in relief, for the New York Giants in 1944.

Miller is one of many ballplayers who only appeared in the major leagues during World War II. He made his major league debut on September 15, 1944, in a road game against the Philadelphia Blue Jays at Shibe Park. His last appearance was on September 29 in a home game against the St. Louis Cardinals at the Polo Grounds. Miller was very effective in his limited big league action. In a total of 5 innings pitched he gave up 5 baserunners and 2 runs, both unearned. His brief career ended with a 0–1 record, 3 games finished, and an ERA of 0.00.

References

External links

1915 births
1991 deaths
Major League Baseball pitchers
Baseball players from Missouri
New York Giants (NL) players